Russel Philip Gibaut (born 5 March 1963) is a Jersey former first-class cricketer.

Gibaut was born at Saint Saviour in Jersey. He studied at Hertford College, Oxford where he played two first-class cricket matches for Oxford University in 1983, against Lancashire and Glamorgan. He later emigrated to the United States, where he worked in the oil industry. His son is the Major League Baseball player Ian Gibaut.

References

External links

1963 births
Living people
People from Saint Saviour, Jersey
Alumni of Hertford College, Oxford
Jersey cricketers
Oxford University cricketers
Jersey emigrants to the United States
BP people